This is a list of women who have served as members of the Islamic Consultative Assembly.

List

See also 
 Women's fraction
 List of female members of the Cabinet of Iran

References 

Lists of women legislators
Islamic Consultative Assembly